Brown & Wood was a New York-based law firm established in 1914 that merged with Chicago-based Sidley & Austin in 2001 to form Sidley Austin Brown & Wood, later shortened to Sidley Austin.

History
The firm was known for its expertise in capital markets work, specifically the representation of issuers and underwriters in securities offerings. According to Securities Data Co., Brown & Wood was ranked first in both issuers and underwriters representation in 1998, and first as legal adviser on securitized debt issues in the same year. Brown & Wood also cultivated a roster of clients in the real estate investment trust, defense of brokerage firms and international securities offerings, among other areas.

Offices
The firm had offices in New York, Beijing, Hong Kong, London (1989), Los Angeles (1971), San Francisco (1986) and Washington, D.C. (1980) as well as a representative office in Tokyo. In 1986, the firm absorbed Tufo & Zuccotti, the firm of former New York City Deputy Mayor John Zuccotti and Peter Tufo, ex Davis Polk & Wardwell attorneys (though Tufo himself did not join Brown & Wood).

Legal issues
Brown & Wood made headlines in 1988 when it famously de-equitized and fired a partner who it accused of poor performance. The attorney, a graduate of Dartmouth College and New York University School of Law was given $120,000 severance pay and was later reduced to driving a limousine. He sued the firm but lost. The presiding judge, Judge Harold Baer Jr. wrote in his opinion, "Many believe that the last decade has seen the bar move from a profession to a business. In some firms we find that profits have replaced pro bono; production has undercut professionalism and compensation has overtaken collegiality" see: book of business (law).

Typical of the old-line Wall Street law firms, many of which have disappeared or merged with out-of-town rivals, Brown & Wood was considered a cordial, if stuffy, work environment. According to The Insider's Guide to Law Firms published in 1993, formal suits were required and "some summer associates [at Brown & Wood] have been asked questions about the number they owned and about their underclothes."

Merging
In an effort to bulk up in a period of strong law firm consolidation, Brown & Wood explored a merger with fellow New York firm White & Case in 1998, but these talks were described as "preliminary in nature." Brown & Wood eventually merged with Sidley & Austin in 2001. Shortly thereafter, the legacy Brown & Wood's offices in the World Trade Center were destroyed in the 9/11 terrorist attacks. The firm relocated its New York operations to midtown Manhattan.

Notable attorneys
 Charles Li – Chinese banker, former CEO of Hong Kong Stock Exchange

References

External links
Car Accident Lawyers
Criminal Defense Lawyer

Defunct law firms of the United States
Law firms based in New York City
Law firms established in 1914
2001 disestablishments in New York (state)
Defunct companies based in New York (state)
1914 establishments in New York (state)
Law firms disestablished in 2001